Jacques Taurin de Lormand (born 4 September 1762 in Bayonne — 24 January 1847 in Bayonne) was a French politician and banker.

Biography 
He was a councillor to the Parliament of Pau under the Old Regime. After the Second Bourbon Restoration, he was a deputy of Basses-Pyrénées from 1815 to 1819, seating within the majority of the Unobtainable Chamber. He worked as a banker. He made a colossal bequest of 5 million francs to the Bayonne town council for different works, including the construction of St. Andrew's Church. The church was built between 1856 and 1869 by architects Hippolyte Durand and Hippolyte Guichenné.

References

Bibliography 
 

1762 births
People from Bayonne
Members of the Chamber of Deputies of the Bourbon Restoration
French bankers
1847 deaths